Katarzyna  is a Polish given name, equivalent to English "Catherine". Its diminutive forms include  Kasia, Katarzynka, Kasieńka, Kasiunia, Kasiulka; augmentative – Kaśka, Kacha, Kachna.

Individuals named Katarzyna may choose their name day from the following dates: February 2, February 13, March 9, March 22, March 24, April 1, April 6, April 17, April 29, April 30, May 21, September 4, September 15, November 25, or December 31.

Notable people

Nobility
 Joanna Katarzyna Radziwiłł, Polish noble lady
 Katarzyna Barbara Radziwiłł, Polish-Lithuanian szlachcianka
 Katarzyna Branicka, Polish noblewoman
 Katarzyna Juszczak, Polish-born Italian judoka and freestyle wrestler
 Katarzyna Karolina Radziwiłł, Polish noble lady
 Katarzyna Kostka, Polish noble lady
 Katarzyna Lubomirska, Polish szlachcianka
 Katarzyna Ostrogska (1560–1579), Polish noble lady
 Katarzyna Ostrogska (1602–1642), Polish szlachcianka
 Katarzyna Potocka, Polish noble lady
 Katarzyna Sobieska, the sister of King of Poland Jan III Sobieski and a noble lady
 Katarzyna Tomicka, Polish noble lady

Artists
 Katarzyna Kobro, Russian sculptor of Polish descent
 Katarzyna Kozyra, one of main Polish video artists

In other fields
 Katarzyna Cichopek, Polish actress
 Katarzyna Figura, Polish actress
 Katarzyna Łaniewska, Polish actress
 Katarzyna Majchrzak, Polish high jumper 
 Katarzyna Rogowiec, Polish Paralympian
 Katarzyna Skowrońska, Polish volleyball player
 Katarzyna Pakosińska, member of Polish cabaret group Kabaret Moralnego Niepokoju
 Katarzyna Dolinska, one of the contestants on America's Next Top Model, Cycle 10
 Katarzyna Strusińska, Polish fashion model known as Kasia Struss

Polish feminine given names